Nectandra latissima is a species of plant in the family Lauraceae. It is found in Bolivia and Peru.

References

latissima
Vulnerable plants
Taxonomy articles created by Polbot
Trees of Bolivia
Trees of Peru